James Greenough may refer to:

James B. Greenough (1833–1901), 19th-century American classical scholar
James C. Greenough, 19th-century American educator and schoolmaster